The Girl on the Train is a 2013 American independent thriller film directed and written by Larry Brand, and produced by James Carpenter, Rebecca Reynolds, Gary Sales. The film stars Henry Ian Cusick, Nicki Aycox, Stephen Lang.

Plot 
Danny Hart, a documentary filmmaker, boards a train at Grand Central Terminal, heading to upstate New York to interview the subjects of his latest project. A chance encounter with a mysterious young woman leads him on a journey of a very different sort, and within the blink of an eye, Hart is forced to leave his complacent life behind for a world in which the line between fantasy and reality is blurred. As Hart tells his strange story to a police detective he finds himself being questioned as Martin tries to discover whether Hart is the victim or the suspect in the strange affair.

Cast 
 Henry Ian Cusick as Danny Hart
 Nicki Aycox as Lexi
 Stephen Lang as Det. Lloyd Martin
 Charles Aitken as Spider
 John Fugelsang as Lottery Guy
 James Biberi as Cabbie
 Waltrudis Buck - Rina Herzman

Production 
The Girl on The Train is directed and written by Larry Brand, and produced by James Carpenter, Rebecca Reynolds, and Gary Sales.  Reynolds and Carpenter, who founded 8180 Films, are married.  Ross Satterwhite was the executive producer.

The Girl on The Train was shot in New York City from March to April 2012, over a total of 17 days. Filming locations include offices in the Wall Street area, an abandoned Catholic school, and Grand Central Terminal.

Release 
The Girl on the Train premiered at the Newport Film Festival.  In November 2013, Monterey Media bought the United States distribution rights to the film, and they released the film in the United States in 2014.

Festivals 
The Girl on the Train was selected to screen at the following film festivals:
 2013 Napa Valley Film Festival – Winner Best Screenplay – Larry Brand
 2013 Big Bear Lake International Film Festival
 2013 Newport Beach Film Festival
 2013 Oaxaca Film Festival
 2013 San Diego Jewish Film Festival
 2013 Traverse City Film Festival
2014 Sedona International Film Festival

References

External links 
 
 
 

2013 films
2013 thriller films
American independent films
American thriller films
American neo-noir films
2013 independent films
2010s English-language films
2010s American films